Tuvalu competed at the 2011 Pacific Games in Nouméa, New Caledonia between August 27 and September 10, 2000 and 11. As of June 28, 2011 Tuvalu has listed 90 competitors.

Athletics

Tuvalu has qualified 2 athletes.

Men
Okilani Tinilau

Women
Asenate Manoa

Badminton

Tuvalu has qualified 3 athletes.

Men
Felo Feoto
Kasipe Galuega

Women
Teuteuga Fasiai

Football

Tuvalu has qualified a men's team.  Each team can consist of a maximum of 21 athletes.
 
Men
Katepu Sieni
Kolone Pokia
Alamoana Tofuola
Etimoni Timuani
Ali Takataka
Mau Penisula
Vaisua Liva
Okilani Tinilau
Lutelu Tiute
James Lepaio
George Panapa
Togavai Stanley
Raj Sogivalu
Faiana Ofati
Uota Ale
Meauma Petaia
Akelei Limaalofa
Lopati Okelani
Joshua Tapasei

Powerlifting

Tuvalu has qualified 1 athlete.

Men
Nakibae Kitiseni - 5th in the 74 kg division

Rugby Sevens

Tuvalu has qualified a men's team.  Each team can consist of a maximum of 12 athletes.

Men
Salemona Tefana
Luagigie Taitaiga
Vete Telina Ofati
Talia Vaitiu
Patiliki Patiliki
Patelu Paisi
Semalie Telavaha Fotu
Tulumani Talia
Teriaua Koio
Olaalofa Eliu
Eric Maatia Toafa
Afaaso Sanaila Bici

Tennis

Tuvalu has qualified 2 athletes.

Men
Iakopo Molotii

Women
Saintly Alesi Molotii

Volleyball

Indoor Volleyball

Tuvalu has qualified a men's and women's team.  Each team can consist of a maximum of 12 members.

Men
Paenui Fagota
Sioni Koum
Afemai Lopati Sigano
Ikapoti Kaisami sunset
Sanelivi Viliamu
Jay Timo
Pelosi Solofa
Siopepa Tailolo

Women
Lillian Tusitala
Fuligafou Vaega
Foma Kalala
Lilly Lafita
Sagalei Uila
Esther Koulapi
Matagimalie Evagelia
Loise Sumeo
Tongauea Teikale
Teala Enele

Weightlifting

Tuvalu has qualified 1 athletes.

Men
Tuau Lapua Lapua -  -62 kg Snatch,  -62 kg Total,  -62 kg Clean & Jerk.

References

Pacific Games
Nations at the 2011 Pacific Games
2011